Freezer Burn is a 2007 independent film, written and directed by Charles Hood.  The film tells the story of a brilliant scientist who falls for his wife's high school art student and, using the technology from his research, figures out a way for them to be together.

Plot
Virgil is a 30-year-old scientist developing technology to permanently preserve human organs for transplantation. However, his obsession with his work takes a toll on his marriage.

Virgil's only distraction is Emma, a 14-year-old student in his wife's high school art class. His sanity hangs in the balance as he struggles to suppress his taboo attraction to the girl. Virgil decides to use his experimental technology to freeze himself, in order to align his age with the young girl's. But his plan doesn't turn out the way he'd hoped.

Cast
 Robert Harriell
 Michael Consiglio
 Ivo Velon
 Blake Stamp 
 CC Seymour
 Emma 
 Ella Rae Peck
 David Faustino

Release
Freezer Burn first premiered at the Park City Film Music Festival on January 13, 2008 and was screened at several other festivals before being released to rent, own, or download on May 26, 2009.

Reception
HorrorNews said, "The movie isn’t without its flaws but it felt like a labor of love and it shows."

Awards
 Silver Medal Audience Award (Park City Film Music Festival)
 Best Feature (Flint Film Festival)
 Distinctive Achievement in Makeup and Production Design (Wild Rose Independent Film Festival)
 Best Screenplay (Kent Film Festival)

References

External links
 
 

2007 films
2007 comedy films
American comedy films
2007 directorial debut films
2000s English-language films
2000s American films